Coeur d'Alene may refer to a people and related place names in the northwestern United States:

 Coeur d'Alene, Idaho, a city in the United States
 Coeur d'Alene Airport
 Coeur d'Alene Charter Academy
 Coeur d'Alene High School
 Coeur d'Alene Press
 Coeur d'Alene Resort
 Coeur d'Alene School District
 Coeur d'Alene people, a Native American tribe
 Coeur d'Alene language
 Coeur d'Alene Reservation

Geographical features
 Coeur d'Alene Mountains, a mountain range in Idaho and Montana
 Coeur d'Alene National Forest, Idaho
 Lake Coeur d'Alene
 Coeur d'Alene River

Other uses
 Coeur d'Alene Avenue Elementary School, Venice, Los Angeles, California
 Coeur d'Alene Mines, an international mining corporation
 Coeur d'Alene salamander
 "Coeur d'Alene", a song from Alter Bridge's album AB III
 Coeur d'Alene Solo, a variation on the Frog card game

See also
 

Language and nationality disambiguation pages